Nancegollan railway station located in Nancegollan, Cornwall served an important agricultural district and was also the railhead for the fishing port of Porthleven.

History

The line was operated by the Great Western Railway and absorbed by that company on 2 August 1898.

Originally it had a single passenger platform on the upside and a goods loop without a platform; the connections were operated by a ground frame. In 1937 the facilities were considerably extended, with a full crossing facility for passenger trains and longer platforms on both lines, as well as a loop line behind the up platform and a large goods yard.

In 1941 the station's goods sidings were further modified and extended in connection with airfield construction in the locality, and a new signal box with a lever frame that had been relocated from the Cornish Main Line at St Germans.  A second, metal, bridge was also built at this time to carry the road over the new goods yard access lines. A camping coach was positioned here by the Western Region from 1958 to 1962.

Due to the line's "uncoloured" classification, heavy locomotives such as GWR Classes 43XX 2-6-0 Tender Engine and 51XX 2-6-2T Tank Engines were allowed as far as Nancegollan only. Although larger locomotives did run past Nancegollan in the branch's dying days the Class 22s ran on the branch even though they were a GWR blue classification, higher than the branch line.

In April 1957, Nancegollan won £10 (£238.65 in today's money) in the British Railways Western Region Station Gardens Competition.

The branch was closed for passengers on 5 November 1962. Goods traffic continued for a further two years, finally ceasing on 5 October 1964; the track was lifted by mid-1965.

Station Masters 
The following people are known to have been Station Masters at Nancegollan Station, with approximate dates show.

S.J. Jeffery, Station Master (? - July 1955 - December 1957)
A. Knight, Station Master (? - ?)
 T. Williams, Station Master (January 1958 - ?)

The site today
Today the site of Nancegollan is an industrial estate.
There are plans for the Helston Railway to extend the line into Nancegollen at some point.

Gallery

References

Disused railway stations in Cornwall
Former Great Western Railway stations
Railway stations in Great Britain opened in 1887
Railway stations in Great Britain closed in 1962